Zangard (also Romanized as Zangārd; also known as Zankard) is a village in Godeh Rural District, in the Central District of Bastak County, Hormozgan Province, Iran. At the 2006 census, its population was 2,080, in 403 families.

References 

Populated places in Bastak County